Ashley van Winkel is a former South African international lawn bowler.

He won a bronze medal in the triples at the 1996 World Outdoor Bowls Championship in Adelaide.

References

South African male bowls players
Living people
Year of birth missing (living people)